Neosteneosaurus is a genus of machimosaurid, known from the Middle Jurassic Oxford Clay of the UK, and Marnes de Dives, France. The type species, N. edwardsi, was originally named as a species of Steneosaurus in 1868, but was moved to its own genus in 2020. Steneosaurus durobrivensis and Steneosaurus hulkei are considered junior synonyms. 

References 

Thalattosuchians
Prehistoric pseudosuchian genera
Callovian life
Oxfordian life
Middle Jurassic reptiles of Europe
Jurassic England
Fossils of England
Jurassic France
Fossils of France
Fossil taxa described in 2020